Football Club Koeppchen Wormeldange is a football club, based in Wormeldange, in eastern Luxembourg.

External links
FC Koeppchen Wormeldange official website

Football clubs in Luxembourg
1919 establishments in Luxembourg
Association football clubs established in 1919